George Ferdinand Becker (1847–1919) was an American geologist. His most important work was in connection with the origin and mode of occurrence of ore deposits, especially those of the western United States.

Biography
Becker was born in New York City, 5 January 1847. He was the son of Alexander Christian Becker and Sarah Carey Tuckerman Becker of Boston, Massachusetts.  He graduated from Harvard University in 1868, studied at Heidelberg, receiving the degree of Ph.D. in 1869, and, two years later, passed the final examination of the Royal School of Mines in Berlin. From 1875 until 1879 he was instructor of mining and metallurgy at the University of California, Berkeley, and in 1879 he became connected with the United States Geological Survey, and later was placed in charge of the California division of geology. In 1880 he was appointed special agent of the 10th census, and in 1882 was further appointed special agent in charge of the investigation of the precious-metal industries.

Becker was a leader in mining geology and geophysics, and for many years was the chief of the Division of Chemical and Physical Research in the United States Geological Survey. The investigations under his direction led to the establishment of the Geophysical Laboratory of the Carnegie Institution of Washington.

In 1896 Becker examined the gold mines of South Africa and at the time of the Spanish–American War was detailed to serve as geologist on the staff of General Bell with the army in the Philippine Islands. Becker served as president of the Geological Society of America in 1914. He died on 20 April 1919 in Washington, D.C.

Publications
 1880: 
 1882: Geology of the Comstock Lode
 1885: Geometrical Form of Volcanic Cones
 1885: Notes on the Stratigraphy of California
 Cretaceous Metamorphic Rocks of California (1886)
 A Theory of Maximum Dissipativity (1886)
 A New Law of Thermo-Chemistry (1886)
 Statistics and Technology of the Precious Metals with S. F. Emmons (1885)
 Geological sketches of the precious metal deposits of the western United States (1885) by Samuel Franklin Emmons and George F. Becker. Extracted from the Tenth United States Census
 Geology of the Quicksilver Deposits of the Pacific Slope (1886).
 Reconnaissance of the Gold Fields of Southern Alaska: With Some Notes on General Geology (1898)
 "Relations Between Local Magnetic Disturbances and the Genesis of Petroleum" US Geological Survey Bulletin No. 401 (1909)
 1910: "The Age of the Earth" Smithsonian Miscellaneous Collections, Vol. 36, No. 6, Publication 1936
 1916: Mechanics of the Panama Canal slides

References

External links

National Academy of Sciences Biographical Memoir
 

1847 births
1919 deaths
American geologists
United States Geological Survey personnel
Harvard University alumni
Heidelberg University alumni
University of California, Berkeley faculty
Presidents of the Geological Society of America
Members of the United States National Academy of Sciences